Leira is a river in Innlandet and Akershus, Norway. It comes down to Romerikssletten westwards, until Maura and swings southwest, until it joins the Rotua and moves southeast and then southwards. Southwest of Gardermoen it runs through land between Nannestad and Ullensaker, along Gjerdrum and Ullensaker, and Gjerdrum and Sørum municipalities. Northeast of Hekseberget it joins the Gjermåa, and at the same time runs into Skedsmo municipality. Later, it passes through Frogner and Leirsund, runs into a meander over the flat lands around Lillestrøm, and exits into the Nitelva. It ends in the land between Skedsmo and Fet.

The name
The name is derived from leire 'clay'. Leira is a common name of rivers many places in Norway.

External links 
 Environment of Leira

Rivers of Viken
Rivers of Innlandet
Lunner
Nannestad
Ullensaker
Gjerdrum
Sørum
Skedsmo
Rivers of Norway